Charalampos Taiganidis is a Greek Paralympic swimming champion, Paralympic gold medalist and multiple medal-winner with a total of 10 Paralympic medals (4 gold, 4 silver and 2 bronze) he holds the record among Greek Paralympic athletes. He was a former S13 swimmer and now competes in the S12 class. He has competed in five consecutive Paralympic games: Athens 2004, Beijing 2008, London 2012, Rio de Janeiro 2016, Tokyo 2020 and has won medals in three of them (2004, 2008 and 2012).

References

Living people
1981 births
Swimmers from Thessaloniki
Paralympic swimmers of Greece
Paralympic gold medalists for Greece
World record holders in paralympic swimming
Swimmers at the 2004 Summer Paralympics
Swimmers at the 2008 Summer Paralympics
Swimmers at the 2012 Summer Paralympics
Swimmers at the 2016 Summer Paralympics
Swimmers at the 2020 Summer Paralympics
Medalists at the 2004 Summer Paralympics
Medalists at the 2008 Summer Paralympics
Medalists at the 2012 Summer Paralympics
Paralympic silver medalists for Greece
Paralympic bronze medalists for Greece
S13-classified Paralympic swimmers
Paralympic medalists in swimming
Greek male freestyle swimmers
Greek male backstroke swimmers
Male medley swimmers
20th-century Greek people
21st-century Greek people